Gary McCann, known professionally as Caspa (born 30 May 1982), is a dubstep music producer from West London.

Biography
McCann's creative involvement in music began after a promising basketball career was cut short by a shoulder injury. Growing up, McCann cites Jungle and Hip Hop as his main influences. He received his first public attention when, his first track, Bassbins recorded under the pseudonym Quiet Storm, was picked up by BBC Radio 1Xtra's DJ Da Flex.

McCann has started his own label, which focuses on dubstep and grime artists. Storming Productions was founded in 2004 and then he joined Stingray Records in 2006. Around this time, he also began his own radio show on Rinse FM. McCann also created an additional label Dub Police to focus specifically on Dubstep. Dub Police is composed of Rusko, L-Wiz, N-Type, The Others and more.

He has performed at a number of high-profile UK music festivals, including Glastonbury and Global Gathering and his release Back for the First Time has received widespread public attention, being playlisted on BBC Radio 1. He has also performed at many other notable festivals around the world such as Exit Festival in Serbia, Stereosonic in Australia and Lollapalooza in the U.S. Despite his widespread success, McCann still finds time to perform every two months at the renowned Fabric in his hometown of London.

His debut album Everybody's Talking, Nobody's Listening was released on 4 May 2009 on Caspa's own label Sub Soldiers/Fabric Records and included an appearance from legendary reggae figure Sir David 'Ram Jam' Rodigan.

In August 2012, it was announced that Caspa and various notable electronic music producers would be featured on the Halo 4 remix album.

"War" featuring Keith Flint was used in the trailer for Kick-Ass 2.

In 2014, McCann moved to Denver, Colorado, US. He cites Denver's music culture and friendly people as influential factors, although he is unsure whether the move will be permanent.

Discography

Releases
"For The Kids" / "Jeffery & Bungle" / "Cockney Flute" – Dub Police – 2006
"Rubber Chicken" – Tempa – 2006
"Cockney Violin" / "Dub Warz" – Dub Police – 2006
"Acton Dread" / "Cockney Flute (Rusko Remix)" – Rusko / Caspa – Dub Police – 2007
"Ave It: Volume 1" – Sub Soldiers – 2007
"Louder" / "Noise Disorganiser" – Pitch Black – 2007
"Bread Get Bun" / "King George" – Aquatic Lab – 2007
"Ohh R Ya – License to Thrill Part 1" – Dub Police – 2007
"Ave It: Volume 2" – Sub Soldiers 2008
"Floor Dem" / "My Pet Monster" – Digital Sound Boy – 2008
"Soulful Geeza – License To Thrill Part 4" – Dub Police – 2008
"Louder VIP" / "Power Shower" – Sub Soldiers – 2009
"The Takeover (featuring Dynamite MC)" / "Marmite" – Sub Soldiers / Fabric 2009
Everybody's Talking, Nobody's Listening – Sub Soldiers / Fabric – 2009
"Are You Ready" – Dub Police / Scion AV – 2010
"I Beat My Robot" / "Marmite (Original Sin Remix)" – Sub Soldiers / Fabric – 2010
"Terminator (Trolley Snatcha Remix)" / "Marmite (Doctor P Remix)" – Sub Soldiers – 2010
"Love Never Dies (Back for the First Time)" – Sub Soldiers – 2010 (with Mr Hudson)
"Neck Snappah" – Sub Soldiers – 2011
"Fulham To Waterloo" / "Bang Bang" – Sub Soldiers – 2011
"Not for the Playlist EP" – Sub Soldiers – 2011
"Sell Out EP" – Sub Soldiers – 2012
"War" (featuring Keith Flint) – EMI UK – 2012
"Check Your Self!" – Released via SoundCloud – 2012
"On It" (featuring Mighty High Coup) – Dub Police – 2012
Alpha Omega – Dub Police – 2013
"Mad Man" (featuring Riko) – Dub Police – 2014
"Neurological" – Submerged Music – 2018

Remixes
DJ Kudos – "Bring The Lights Down (Caspa Mix)" – Sound Proof Records – 2006
Art of Noise – "Moments in Love (Caspa Remix)" – Not on Label – 2007
N-Type / The Others – "Way of the Dub (Caspa Remix) / Bushido (Caspa Remix)" – Dub Police – 2007
Matty G – "West Coast Rocks (Caspa Remix)" – Argon – 2007
Wonder – "What (Caspa Remix)" – Wonderland – 2008
Lennie De Ice – "We Are I E (Caspa & Rusko Remix") – Y4K – 2008
TC – "Wheres My Money (Caspa Remix)" – D-Style Recordings – 2008
Depeche Mode – "Wrong (Caspa Remix)"- EMI – 2009
Deadmau5 & Kaskade – "I Remember (Caspa Remix)" – Mau5trap – 2009
Rusko – "Cockney Thug (Caspa Remix)" – Sub Soldiers – 2009
Grand Puba – "Get it (Caspa's 80Eightie's Remix)" – Scion/AV – 2009
Kid Sister – "Right Hand Hi (Caspa Remix)" – Asylum Records – 2009
Miike Snow – "Black & Blue (Caspa Remix)" – Columbia – 2009
Breakage Feat. Newham Generals & David Rodigan – "Hard (Caspa & The Others – The Dub Police Takeover Remix)" – Digital Soundboy – 2009
Adam F & Horx feat. Redman – "Shut The Lights Off (Caspa & Trolley Snatcha – The Dub Police Takeover Remix)" – Breakbeat Kaos – 2009
30 Seconds To Mars Feat. Kanye West – "Hurricane (Caspa Remix)" – Capitol – 2010
Ludacris – "How Low (Caspa Remix)" – Def Jam – 2010
Swedish House Mafia Feat. Pharrell – "One" (Your Name) (Caspa Remix) – Polydore – 2012
Katy B – "Easy Please Me (Caspa Remix)" – Rinse – 2011
Buraka Som Sistema – "Hangover (BaBaBa) (Caspa Remix)" – Enchufada – 2011
Plan B – "Ill Manors (Caspa Remix)" – Atlantic – 2012
Neil Davidge – "Ascendancy (Halo 4 OST) (Caspa Remix)" – 7 Hz Productions – 2012
Deadmau5 – "FML (Caspa Re-Fix)" – Released via SoundCloud – 2012
The Prodigy - "The Day Is My Enemy" (Caspa Remix) - Take Me to the Hospital/Cooking Vinyl, Three Six Zero/Warner Bros - 2015

DJ mixes
Caspa & Rusko – FabricLive.37 – fabric – 2007
"My Style" – Dub Police – 2010
Caspa – Mix 1.0 – 2017

References

External links
Official website

Caspa's SoundCloud

Dubstep musicians
DJs from London
English record producers
Living people
1982 births
Electronic dance music DJs